Francisco Gonzalez Cigarroa (born December 7, 1957) is an American transplant surgeon who served as chancellor of the University of Texas System. As a Mexican-American, Cigarroa is also the first Hispanic to serve as president of the University of Texas Health Science Center at San Antonio (UTHSCSA). Cigarroa currently serves as chairman of the Ford Foundation. He also serves as the head of pediatric transplant surgery at UTHSCSA.

Born in the border city of Laredo in south Texas, Cigarroa graduated from J. W. Nixon High School. In 1979, he earned a bachelor's degree from Yale University in New Haven, Connecticut. He received his medical degree from the University of Texas Southwestern Medical Center at Dallas in 1983. He was elected to Alpha Omega Alpha, a national honor society for medical students, residents, scientists, and physicians in the United States and Canada.

During his twelve years of postgraduate training, Cigarroa was chief resident at Massachusetts General Hospital – the teaching hospital of Harvard Medical School in Boston, Massachusetts – and completed pediatric surgery and transplant surgery fellowships at Johns Hopkins Hospital in Baltimore, Maryland.

In January 2009, Cigarroa was appointed chancellor of the University of Texas System. He is the first Hispanic to ever lead a major university system in the United States. Before this appointment he had been the first Hispanic president of the University of Texas Health Science Center at San Antonio.

On July 1, 2010, Cigarroa began serving an elected six-year term as an Alumni Fellow to the Yale Corporation, the governing body of Yale University.

In August 2011, Cigarroa presented to the University Board of Regents his Framework for Advancing Excellence designed to make the University of Texas System one of the top-ranked US educational systems of higher learning. The framework was unanimously approved by the Board of Regents and has since received national acclaim. In December 2011, Cigarroa was invited to the White House to share his program with US President Barack Obama and US Secretary of Education Arne Duncan.

On February 10, 2014, Cigarroa announced his resignation from the UT System. His office forwarded third party letters of recommendations to the president's office at UT Austin, but he was not involved in overturning decisions made by the admissions committee. He played a leadership role in uncovering admission wrongdoings at UT Austin by commissioning the Kroll Report. He currently works as Director of Transplantation Services at the University of Texas Health Science Center San Antonio.

References

External links

Official University of Texas System profile

1957 births
American academics of Mexican descent
American transplant surgeons
Chancellors of the University of Texas System
Fellows of the American Academy of Arts and Sciences
Harvard Medical School people
J. W. Nixon High School alumni
Johns Hopkins University people
Living people
People from Laredo, Texas
People from San Antonio
University of Texas Southwestern Medical Center alumni
Yale University alumni
Members of the National Academy of Medicine